Castéra-Lanusse is a commune in the Hautes-Pyrénées department in south-western France.

See also 
 Communes of the Hautes-Pyrénées department

References 

Communes of Hautes-Pyrénées